The 27th Annual Bengal Film Journalists' Association Awards were held in 1964, honoring the best in Indian cinema in 1963.

Main Awards

Best Indian Films (In Order of Merit)
 Mahanagar
 Nirjan Saikate
 Bandini
 Saat Paake Bandha
 Palatak
 Uttar Falguni
 Gumrah
 Nisithey
 Chhaya Surya
 Dil Ek Mandir

Best Director
Tapan Sinha - Nirjan Saikate

Best Actor
Anup Kumar - Palatak

Best Actress
Suchitra Sen - Uttar Falguni

Best Actor in Supporting Role
Bikash Roy - Uttar Falguni

Best Actress in Supporting Role
Ruma Guha Thakurata - Palatak

Best Screenplay
Tapan Sinha - Nirjan Saikate

Best Cinematographer
Bimal Mukherjee - Nirjan Saikate

Best Art Director
Banshi Chandragupta - Mahanagar

Best Music Director
Hemanta Mukherjee - Palatak

Best Lyricist
Mukul Dutta and Gouri Prasanna Majumdar - Palatak

Best Audiographer
Nripen Paul and Sujit Sarkar - Uttar Falguni

Best Dialogue
Satyajit Ray - Mahanagar

Hindi Section

Best Director
Bimal Roy - Bandini

Best Actor
Ashok Kumar - Gumrah

Best Actress
Nutan - Bandini

Best Actor in Supporting Role
Raaj Kumar - Dil Ek Mandir

Best Actress in Supporting Role
Shashikala - Gumrah

Best Music Director
Chitragupta - Ganga Maiyya Tohe Piyari Chadhaibo (Bhojpuri film)

Best Screenplay
Agha Jani Kashmiri - Yeh Rastey Hain Pyar Ke

Best Lyricist
Shakeel Badayuni - Mere Mehboob

Best Cinematographer
K. H. Kapadia - Yeh Rastey Hain Pyar Ke

Best Art Director
Sudhendu Roy - Mere Mehboob

Best Audiographer
Y. M. Wagle and Nasir and S. L. Pathak - Mere Mehboob

Best Dialogue
Vinod Kumar - Mere Mehboob

Foreign Film Section

Ten Best Films
 The Birds
 Judgment at Nuremberg
 The World of Suzie Wong
 The Cranes Are Flying
 Can-Can
 To Kill a Mockingbird
 The Loudest Whisper
 The V.I.P.s
 El Cid
 A Very Private Affair

Best Director
Alfred Hitchcock - The Birds

Best Actor
Charlton Heston - El Cid

Best Actress
Nancy Kwan - The World of Suzie Wong

Best Supporting Actor
Maurice Chevalier - Can-Can

Best Supporting Actress
Margaret Rutherford - The V.I.P.s

See also
 26th Annual BFJA Awards
 28th Annual BFJA Awards

References

Bengal Film Journalists' Association Awards